Jeffrey Foskett (February 17, 1956) is an American singer, songwriter, and record producer best known as a touring and studio musician for Brian Wilson and the Beach Boys since the 1980s. Foskett was described as the Beach Boys' "vice principal" by its touring members. In 1996, he debuted as a solo artist with the album Thru My Window.

Early career

Born and raised in San Jose, California, Foskett began his first band in the 1970s known as Cherry, after the Willow Glen area street on which he lived. Foskett played mostly surf music covers in the same market as Papa Doo Run Run, with whom Foskett would join forces later. In the late 1970s, Foskett formed two renowned bands: The Reverie Rhythm Rockers (aka Reverie) and The Pranks while attending UCSB in Santa Barbara, California, gigging throughout the area with fellow area bands like D. B. Cooper. The band held a house residency at The Troubadore Nightclub in Hollywood Mondays performing with The Mentors, The Cretones, The Police and 20/20.

Working with Brian Wilson and the Beach Boys

Foskett became a fan of the Beach Boys after he heard "I Get Around" and became determined to meet Brian Wilson. In 1976, Foskett tracked down Wilson's house in Bel Air, which had a stained-glass window resembling the artwork of the 1967 album Wild Honey. After knocking on Wilson's door, he was greeted by a friendly Wilson and quickly invited into his house as a guest. The two then kept in contact over the years.

In late 1979, Wilson's cousin Mike Love stopped by the famous Santa Barbara restaurant "1129" where Reverie was the house band. Love listened to Foskett and hired Reverie as the original incarnation of The Endless Summer Beach Band. The band toured with Love through December 1981, when Foskett replaced Wilson's brother Carl Wilson who briefly left The Beach Boys to pursue a solo career. When Carl rejoined the Beach Boys in May 1982, Foskett was asked to stay to perform Wilson's falsetto parts, which he did until 1990.

When Brian Wilson returned to touring in the late 1990s, he asked Foskett to help him assemble his touring band. Foskett was the musical director, appearing at every solo show Wilson had performed, up until his departure from Wilson's band. In concerts, Foskett provided lead vocals on several of Wilson's songs, including "Don't Worry Baby", "The Warmth Of The Sun" and "Wouldn't It Be Nice" as well as others. Foskett has appeared as guitarist/vocalist/arranger on a majority of Wilson solo material, including the 2004 version of SMiLE.

In 2012, Foskett joined the Beach Boys' live band on their 50th Anniversary Reunion Tour, and subsequently recorded the studio album That's Why God Made the Radio alongside the band, performing all of the falsetto vocal parts as well as other vocals on the record. Regarding his role in the reunion, Al Jardine stated, "Jeffrey is invaluable to keeping the continuity between the various component parts. He supports Brian in every possible way. He has Brian's confidence, and basically kind of makes it possible to have Brian Wilson on the road with us. [Without] that shoulder to lean on, I think it would be very difficult for Brian to tour. And I'm very grateful for that." On the tour he provided lead vocals on "Don't Worry Baby", "Wouldn't It Be Nice" and "Why Do Fools Fall In Love" as well as singing all of the falsetto vocals.

Following the reunion tour, Foskett resumed touring with Wilson in 2013. Wilson enlisted guitarist Jeff Beck to accompany him and Foskett on his tour and collaborate with him on his next album. Foskett left the touring band in late 2013, citing sudden heavy workload on touring and recording the album. Foskett said “After the Jeff Beck tour, I was completely stressed and burned out. That whole year, recording that album and that tour — because I knew Jeff so well — a lot of things fell on me to get done that normally would have been other people’s responsibilities. So, at the end of that tour, I kind of snapped — literally — and just said, ‘I can’t do this anymore'. However Brian views me, is alright with me, as long as he knows I love him." Foskett was replaced by Matt Jardine, who joined Wilson along with his father and founding member Al Jardine on his tours.

On May 15, 2014, it was announced that Foskett would be re-joining the Beach Boys as a permanent member of the touring band. Foskett also performed on Love's solo albums Unleash the Love (2017) and Reason for the Season (2018).

In early 2019, Foskett took leave from the Beach Boys due to undergoing throat surgery. In late 2019, Foskett announced that he had been diagnosed with stage 4 anaplastic thyroid cancer in early 2018 and that his falsetto vocal range has heavily deteriorated as a result of several surgeries and treatments on his vocal cords. In addition, he said he would release his next album Voices, which he said may possibly be his last album as a solo artist, on November 22, 2019, though added that he would also continue as a live musician and possibly explore doing record production work.

Other work
Foskett has released several solo albums including Thru My Window, touted as "The best Beach Boys album they never recorded",  Cool and Gone and Twelve and Twelve. Foskett has won several awards including Top Selling Artist of the Year in New Zealand and Best New Foreign Artist in Japan.  He is also a member of "California Rocks" the California Rock Hall of Fame

In addition to The Beach Boys/Brian Wilson, Foskett has toured and recorded with other friends in the music industry such as Paul McCartney, Jeff Beck, Roy Orbison, The Everly Brothers, Christopher Cross, Michael McDonald, Chicago, America, Heart, Roger McGuinn, Eric Carmen, Eric Clapton, Jimmy Page,  and Ringo Starr. Jeff is one of a very few Artists who has recorded and performed live with The Big Three Guitar Greats Beck, Page and Clapton. He also produces other artists including Harry Shearer of Spinal Tap and Micky Dolenz of The Monkees.

In 2016, Italia Guitars released their first Signature Model Guitar honoring Jeff named "The JF-12" Twelve String Guitar.

In 2017, Italia Guitars released their second Signature Model Guitar honoring Jeff named "The JF-6" Six String Guitar.

At the 2018 NAMM Show, Italia Guitars released their third Signature Model Guitar honoring Jeff named "The JF-Q" Six String Guitar.

In 2018, Foskett released the long in the works new duet studio album with Jeff Larson entitled "Elua Aloha", released on June 12.

Jeffrey is an avid supporter of The MD Anderson Cancer Center at The University of Texas, Houston, The Gary Sinise Foundation and The Carl Wilson Foundation.

Discography
Studio albums

Thru My Window (1996) 
Sunny's Off (1996)
Christmas At The Beach (1997)
Cool and Gone (1997)
Twelve and Twelve (1998)
Elua Aloha (2018) (Jeffrey Foskett and Jeff Larson)
Love Songs (2019)
Vintage Summer (2019)
Voices (2019)

Compilations

The Other Takes (1996) 
Greatest Hits (1998)
Tributes and Rarities (1999)
Stars in the Sand (2000) 
Classic Harmony (2015)
The Best of Jeffrey Foskett (2016)
You Remind Me of the Sun (2017)

References

External links
 

Living people
American male singers
1956 births
Musicians from San Jose, California
Singers from California
Guitarists from California
American male guitarists
The Beach Boys backing band members
20th-century American guitarists
20th-century American male musicians